Hiriq  (   ) is a Hebrew niqqud vowel sign represented by a single dot  underneath the letter. In Modern Hebrew, it indicates the phoneme  which is similar to the "ee" sound in the English word deep and is transliterated with "i". In Yiddish, it indicates the phoneme  which is the same as the "i" sound in the English word skip and is transliterated with "i".

Spelling 
When writing with niqqud, the letter yud  is often written after the letter that carries the Hiriq sign. This is called , meaning "full" (or "plene") hiriq. In writing without niqqud, the letter yud is added more often as a mater lectionis, than in writing with niqqud, The main exception is the i vowel in a syllable that ends with shva naḥ. For example the words סִדְרָה (series) and סִדְּרָה (she organized) are pronounced identically in modern Hebrew, but in spelling without niqqud סִדְרָה is written סדרה because there is a shva naḥ on the letter ד, and סִדְּרָה is written סידרה.

Pronunciation
The following table contains the pronunciation and transliteration of the different Hiriqs in reconstructed historical forms and dialects using the International Phonetic Alphabet. The pronunciation in IPA is above and the transliteration is below.

The letter Bet used in this table is only for demonstration. Any letter can be used.

Vowel length comparison
These vowels lengths are not manifested in Modern Hebrew. In addition, the short i is usually promoted to a long i in Israeli writing for the sake of disambiguation.

In Hebrew spelling this would be pronounced .   is written  then .

Computer encoding

See also
Niqqud
Unicode and HTML for the Hebrew alphabet

Niqqud